Leckview Park is a football stadium in County Donegal, Ireland. Located on the banks of the River Swilly on Canal Street close to central Letterkenny, it is the home ground of Letterkenny Rovers. It is also close to the county's largest multi-screen cinema complex at Leckview Lane on Letterkenny's Pearse Road.

The stadium's name refers to Conwal and Leck in which it is located, and the stadium can be easily viewed through the trees from the similarly named cemetery across the river.

The stadium is, and will soon be, subject to major renovations in the coming years due to the ambition of Rovers to progress further as a football team.

References

Buildings and structures in Letterkenny
Association football venues in the Republic of Ireland
Association football venues in County Donegal
Letterkenny Rovers F.C.